The National Basketball League (NBL) was a professional basketball league in the United States established in 1937. After the 1948–49 season, its twelfth, it merged with the Basketball Association of America (BAA) to create the National Basketball Association (NBA). Five current NBA teams trace their history back to the NBL: the Atlanta Hawks, the Detroit Pistons, the Los Angeles Lakers, the Philadelphia 76ers, and the Sacramento Kings.

History 
The predecessor of this league was the Midwest Basketball Conference (MBC) in 1935. It changed its name in 1937 in an attempt to attract a larger audience. The league was created by three corporations: General Electric, Firestone and Goodyear. It was primarily made up of  Great Lakes area small-market and corporate teams.

The league began rather informally.  Scheduling was left to the discretion of each of the teams, as long as the team played at least ten games and four of them were on the road. Games played increased yearly as the popularity of professional basketball and the NBL grew in America. Games consisted either of four ten-minute quarters or three fifteen-minute periods. The choice was made by the home team. Some of the teams were independent, while others were owned by companies that also found jobs for their players.

Chicago newspaper sports editor Leo Fischer acted as president of the NBL from 1940–44.

In 1946, the Basketball Association of America (BAA) incorporated resulting in a three-year battle with the NBL to win both players and fans. The BAA played its games in larger cities and venues. However, NBL tended to have the bigger stars. NBL teams dominated the World Professional Basketball Tournament, an annual invitational tournament held in Chicago and sponsored by the Chicago Herald American; won seven out of ten editions of the tournament.

On August 3, 1949, representatives from the 12-year-old NBL and 3 year old BAA met at the BAA offices in New York's Empire State Building to finalize a merger.  Maurice Podoloff was elected head of the new league. The new National Basketball Association (NBA) was made up of 17 teams that represented both small towns and large cities across the country. The NBA claims the BAA's history as its own and considers the 1949 deal as an expansion, not a merger. For example, at NBA History online, its table of one-line "NBA Season Recaps" begins 1946–47 without comment. It celebrated "NBA at 50" in 1996, with announcement of its 50 Greatest Players among other things.

The NBA does not recognize NBL records and statistics except under certain circumstances. As such, the records and statistics of the BAA and NBL prior to the merger in 1949 are considered in official NBA history only if a player, coach, or team participated in the newly formed NBA after 1949 for one or more seasons.
 
The history of the NBL falls into three eras, each contributing significantly to the growth of professional basketball and the emergence of the NBA. The first dynasty centered on the Oshkosh All-Stars and their center Leroy "Cowboy" Edwards. The middle years saw the emergence of the Fort Wayne Zollner Pistons, who were later instrumental in the survival of the NBA during its infancy. The final period of note during the NBL's existence centered on George Mikan and the emergence of the big man in basketball.

Early years

The Oshkosh All-Stars appeared in the championship series for five consecutive years (1938–42). They won two titles, they were led by a rugged 6' 4" (1.93 m) center named Leroy "Cowboy" Edwards. Edwards was a consensus NCAA "All American" and Helms Foundation "College Player of the Year" as a member of the 1934–35 University of Kentucky Wildcats. He left Kentucky after two years to pursue a professional basketball career, which was unheard of at the time. He led the NBL in scoring for three consecutive seasons, 1937-1940. He set numerous NBL and professional basketball scoring records and is generally credited with the introduction of the "3 second rule" in basketball which is still in existence today. Edwards played in all 12 NBL seasons with the Oshkosh All-Stars, and retired just prior to its merger with the BAA to form the NBA.

Middle years 

The Fort Wayne Zollner Pistons—so nicknamed because they were owned by Fred Zollner, whose company made pistons for engines—were led by tough veteran Bobby McDermott. The Pistons finished second in 1942 and 1943 and won the league title in 1944 and 1945. Like many teams of that era, it was not uncommon for Fort Wayne to play its games in taverns, armories, high-school gyms or ballrooms.

Under Zollner, the Pistons would eventually play an important role in the survival and growth of the NBA. Zollner's financial support of the NBA helped the league stay afloat during its tumultuous formative years.

Challenging the Zollner Pistons and Oshkosh for supremacy were the Sheboygan Red Skins. Beginning in 1941, the season before Fort Wayne joined the NBL, Sheboygan appeared in five of six championship series. They lost to Oshkosh in the 1941 finals, beat Fort Wayne for the title in 1943 but lost to the Zollner Pistons in 1944 and 1945, and were swept in the 1946 finals by the league's newest member, the powerhouse Rochester Royals, who boasted Hall of Famers Al Cervi, Bob Davies and Red Holzman.

Later years 

The NBL's third era was dominated by Mikan, the 6'10" (2.08 m), three-time NCAA "All-American" center from DePaul University in Chicago. As a rookie, he led the Chicago American Gears to the 1947 NBL title, but before the next season, owner Maurice White pulled his team out of the league and formed his own 24-team circuit called the Professional Basketball League of America. That venture quickly failed, and Mikan was signed by the NBL's Minneapolis Lakers, where he teamed with the versatile Jim Pollard to win the 1948 championship.

After the 1947–48 season, Mikan's Lakers quit the League to join the Basketball Association of America (BAA), along with three other NBL clubs: Rochester, Fort Wayne, and Indianapolis.

The NBL added an all-black team in December of its final season, when one of its replacement clubs folded, the Detroit Vagabond Kings. That franchise was awarded to a famous barnstorming team, the New York Rens, composed entirely of African Americans, to play out the season in Dayton, Ohio, as the Dayton Rens. In 1949, after a three-year battle with the BAA for fans and players, the NBL was absorbed by the BAA and became the NBA.

Legacy 

The NBL contributed significantly to the foundation of the NBA, but it also had major accomplishments in other areas, most notably in offering opportunities for African-American players. In the 1942–43 season, with many players in the armed forces, two NBL clubs, the Toledo Jim White Chevrolets and the Chicago Studebakers, filled their rosters by signing African-Americans—five years before Jackie Robinson would break baseball's color barrier with the Brooklyn Dodgers. Neither team fared well. Toledo signed several black players to start the season, including Bill Jones, who had starred at the University of Toledo, but the team lost its first four games and folded due to financial difficulties. Chicago stocked its roster with several members of the Harlem Globetrotters, who worked during the week at the Studebaker plant, but it also folded after compiling an 8–15 record.

Five current NBA teams trace their history back to the NBL. Three teams joined the BAA in 1948: the Minneapolis Lakers (now the Los Angeles Lakers), the Rochester Royals (now the Sacramento Kings), and the Fort Wayne Zollner Pistons (now the Detroit Pistons). Two more teams were part of the merger that created the NBA in 1949: the Buffalo Bisons/Tri-Cities Blackhawks (now the Atlanta Hawks), and the Syracuse Nationals (now the Philadelphia 76ers).

Five former NBA teams also trace their history back to the NBL: the Anderson Packers, Denver Nuggets, Indianapolis Jets (as the Kautskys), Sheboygan Red Skins and Waterloo Hawks played in the NBL/BAA/NBA.  The Jets played in the BAA for the 1948–49 season only; the remaining teams for the 1949–50 season only.  Anderson, Sheboygan, and Waterloo joined the National Professional Basketball League in 1950.

The NBL also created the Indianapolis Olympians for the 1949–50 NBL season. When the NBL and BAA merged, this team joined the NBA without playing a single NBL game.

Also still surviving are the Akron Goodyear Wingfoots, the initial NBL Champion in 1938. The Wingfoots suspended operations for World War II and were not included in the NBL/BAA merger. Instead, they remained in the National Industrial Basketball League (NIBL), which in 1961 became the National AAU Basketball League (NABL). The Wingfoots are still an AAU Elite team in the NABL.

Teams 

Note: # denotes a team currently playing in the NBA.

Season leaders, awards, and championships 
 List of NBL champions
 List of NBL season scoring leaders
 List of NBL career scoring leaders
 List of NBL Most Valuable Players
 List of NBL Rookies of the Year
 List of NBL Coaches of the Year

References

External links 
 Complete National Basketball League History 1937–49
 National Basketball League at Basketball-Reference.com
 Abstracts of open papers, NASSH 2002 – including "The NBA Began in Akron!? The Midwest Basketball Conference, 1935–37"], Murry Nelson, Pennsylvania State University

 
1937 establishments in the United States
1949 disestablishments in the United States
Sports leagues established in 1937
Sports leagues disestablished in 1949
Defunct basketball leagues in the United States